Wakefield by-election may refer to:

Australia
 1909 Wakefield by-election, following the death of the Speaker, Frederick Holder
 1938 Wakefield by-election, following the death of Charles Hawker

United Kingdom
 1874 Wakefield by-election, following the voided election of Edward Green 
 1932 Wakefield by-election, following the death of George Hillman
 1954 Wakefield by-election, following the death of Arthur Greenwood
 2022 Wakefield by-election, following the resignation of Imran Ahmad Khan